Prescott Regional Airport, Ernest A. Love Field  is a public use airport  north of Prescott, in Yavapai County, Arizona, United States. Love Field is used for general aviation and facilitates scheduled passenger airline service to Denver and Los Angeles.

Most traffic at PRC is training flights from Embry-Riddle Aeronautical University but includes training flights from operations including Guidance Aviation and North-Aire.

Namesake 
The airport is named for Ernest A. Love (1895–1918), First Lieutenant, United States Army Air Service. Love was born in New Mexico and raised in Prescott. He was a graduate of Prescott High School and studied mechanical engineering at Stanford. He served in World War I and was shot down near Verdun, France, on 16 September 1918, and he died of his wounds as a prisoner of war a few days later. Lieutenant Love is buried at Arlington National Cemetery. The hamlet of Love, Arizona, is also named for him.

Facilities
It has three asphalt runways:
 3R/21L measuring 
 3L/21R measuring 
 12/30 measuring 

Plans to extend Runway 3R/21L and Runway 3L/21R were mentioned in the latest master plan update in 2009. The extension onto Runway 3R/21L would be more than 3,300 feet and the extension onto Runway 3L/21R would be more than 1,300 feet.

In the year ending March 31, 2011 the airport had 244,080 aircraft operations, average 668 per day: 98.2% general aviation, 1.6% air taxi, <1% military, and <1% airline. 232 aircraft were then based at this airport: 89% single-engine, 8% multi-engine, 1% helicopter, 1% jet, and <1% glider.

Terminal

In 2019, the City of Prescott received a $10 million grant from the Federal Aviation Administration for construction of a new terminal building. The building will also be funded with $1 million from the state of Arizona and $3.5 million of local funds. The new building will have more space for passengers, security, and airline operations. The existing building is considered "antiquated and undersized." The new passenger terminal opened to the public in March 2021.

Airline and destinations

Passenger

Statistics

Enplanement totals

Carrier Shares

Top Domestic Destinations

Cargo

Historical airline service 
The first airline flights at Prescott were TWA DC-3s in late 1947.

2008–2018
Great Lakes Airlines served the airport since 2008, when Mesa Airlines terminated their agreement. Although Great Lakes over the last few years ran into staffing issues due to the nationwide pilot shortage, Prescott has always been one of their top destinations. In 2016, the company turned itself around and was able to pull out of its staffing problems by signing a contract with Frontier Airlines to employ their pilots after they have completed a required employment period with Great Lakes first. The company currently flies to Los Angeles and Phoenix; it cut back on the destinations it served so it could dramatically increase reliability and staffing abilities towards its profitable airports. Prescott in November received the first of several planned upgrades by the company.
Great Lakes increased its total round trip daily flights to/from Los Angeles from two flights a day to four. On December 17, 2016 part two of the upgrade plan took place, which included bringing in a larger aircraft, an Embraer EMB-120, which included 30 seats, restroom facilities and flight attendant service. The company has also leased a corporate maintenance hangar on the airfield and planned to employ a full-time aircraft mechanic to turn Prescott into a west coast maintenance hub. Finally, the airline resumed flying to Denver, CO twice per week with one stop in Farmington, New Mexico. In 2017, Great Lakes reverted to two flights per day to Los Angeles and two flights per week to Denver using Beech 1900D aircraft. On March 26, 2018, Great Lakes Airlines ceased operations, terminating all scheduled flights from Ernest A. Love Field.

2018–present
On July 17, 2018, United Airlines announced service from Ernest A. Love Field to Denver and Los Angeles with each running a daily flight, which began on August 29, 2018. United Airlines service is operated by SkyWest Airlines dba United Express operating 50 seat Bombardier CRJ-200 jet aircraft.

Historical 

The following is a list of all known air carriers that have served Prescott. Most of these airlines provided flights to Phoenix and Las Vegas.
 Arizona Airways  1946–1948
 Trans World Airlines (TWA) 1947–1949
 Frontier Airlines  1950–1964
 Bonanza Airlines  1949–1968
 Air West  1968–1970
 Hughes Air West 1970–1974
 Apache Airlines  early 1970s
 Cochise Airlines  1974–1982
 Golden Pacific Airlines  1982–1989
 Sun West Airlines  1984–1985
 Mesa Airlines  1989–1992
 America West Express (Mesa Airlines)  1992–2005
 Great Lakes Airlines  2005–2007
 Alaska Airlines (Horizon Air) 2008–2010
 US Airways Express (Mesa Airlines)  2007–2008
 Great Lakes Airlines  2008–2018
 United Express (SkyWest Airlines)  2018–present

See also 
 List of airports in Arizona

References

Other sources 

 Essential Air Service documents (Docket DOT-OST-1996-1899) from the U.S. Department of Transportation:
 Order 2005-3-16 (March 9, 2005): selecting Great Lakes Aviation, Ltd. to provide essential air service at Kingman, Prescott, Page, and Show Low for a new two-year period, at a combined first-year subsidy of $3,840,959, and a combined second-year subsidy of $3,854,958.
 Order 2007-6-10 (June 13, 2007): selecting Mesa Air Group, Inc. d/b/a Air Midwest to provide subsidized essential air service at Kingman and Prescott, Arizona, for two years, beginning when the carrier full service. Service will consist of three round trips a day (18 per week) with 19-seat Beech 1900D aircraft over a Kingman Prescott Phoenix or Prescott Kingman Las Vegas routing, at a total annual subsidy of $1,798,489 for both communities.
 Order 2008-6-11 (June 10, 2008): selecting Great Lakes Aviation, Ltd. to provide essential air service at Kingman and Prescott, Arizona, for a two-year period beginning when the carrier inaugurates full service at both communities at a combined annual subsidy of $2,898,490.
 Order 2011-3-4 (March 1, 2011): re-selecting Great Lakes Aviation, Ltd. to provide essential air service at Kingman, Page, Prescott, and Show Low, Arizona for the two-year period from May 1, 2011, to April 30, 2013, for a combined annual subsidy of $5,596,114.
 Order 2013-6-1 (June 3, 2013): re-selecting Great Lakes Aviation, Ltd. to provide Essential Air Service at Kingman, Page, Prescott, and Show Low, Arizona, for the two-year period from May 1, 2013, through April 30, 2015, for a combined annual subsidy of $7,873,533. Subsidy for Prescott: $2,094,235. Routing: PRC-LAX nonstop and/or DEN one-stop. Weekly Frequency: 18. Aircraft: Beechcraft 1900D. Seats: 19.

External links 
 
 Ernest A. Love Field (PRC) at Arizona DOT airport directory
 Aerial image as of June 1992 from USGS The National Map
 
 
 

Airports in Yavapai County, Arizona
Prescott, Arizona
Essential Air Service